A Christmas Wedding is a 2006 American made-for-television romantic comedy film directed by Michael Zinberg and starring Dean Cain, Sarah Paulson, and Eric Mabius. It was originally broadcast December 11, 2006 on Lifetime.

Cast
 Sarah Paulson as Emily
 Eric Mabius as Ben
 Richard Blackburn as Robert
 Dean Cain as Tucker
 Reagan Pasternak as Jill
 Art Hindle as Jack
 Louise Pitre as Beth
 Mimi Kuzyk as Katharine
 George Buza as Big Daddy
 Owen Pattison as  Buck Junior
 Dwayne Hill as Buck Senior
 Robert Bockstael as The Pastor

Reception
DVD Talk said, "A Christmas Wedding inexplicably misses some obvious opportunities to juice up its rather staid plotline."

See also 
 List of Christmas films

References

External links
 
 https://web.archive.org/web/20130625160633/http://www.mylifetime.com/movies/a-christmas-wedding
 http://www.rottentomatoes.com/m/a_christmas_wedding/

Lifetime (TV network) films
American Christmas films
Films about weddings
2006 television films
2006 films
Christmas television films
2000s English-language films